Agathis labillardieri is a species of conifer in the family Araucariaceae. It is known by the common name New Guinea kauri. It is native to the island of New Guinea, where it is found in both Papua New Guinea and the side belonging to Indonesia.

This is a long-lived tree that can be found in several habitat types, including peat swamp forest and mountain forests on soils of serpentine and limestone. It is one of the most valuable timber species in the area and it is threatened by logging.

References

labillardieri
Flora of New Guinea
Taxonomy articles created by Polbot